In computer science, a linear grammar is a context-free grammar that has at most one nonterminal in the right-hand side of each of its productions.

A linear language is a language generated by some linear grammar.

Example
An example of a linear grammar  is G with N = {S}, Σ = {a, b}, P with start symbol S and rules
 S → aSb
 S → ε
It generates the language .

Relationship with regular grammars
Two special types of linear grammars are the following:
 the left-linear or left-regular grammars, in which all rules are of the form A → αw where α is either empty or a single nonterminal and w is a string of terminals;
 the right-linear or right-regular grammars, in which all rules are of the form A → wα where w is a string of terminals and α is either empty or a single nonterminal.
Each of these can describe exactly the regular languages.
A regular grammar is a grammar that is left-linear or right-linear.

Observe that by inserting new nonterminals, any linear grammar can be replaced by an equivalent one where some of the rules are left-linear and some are right-linear.  For instance, the rules of G above can be replaced with
 S → aA
 A → Sb
 S → ε

However, the requirement that all rules be left-linear (or all rules be right-linear) leads to a strict decrease in the expressive power of linear grammars.

Expressive power
All regular languages are linear; conversely, an example of a linear, non-regular language is {  }. as explained above.
All linear languages are context-free; conversely, an example of a context-free, non-linear language is the Dyck language of well-balanced bracket pairs.
Hence, the regular languages are a proper subset of the linear languages, which in turn are a proper subset of the context-free languages.

While regular languages are deterministic, there exist linear languages that are nondeterministic. For example, the language of even-length palindromes on the alphabet of 0 and 1 has the linear grammar S → 0S0 | 1S1 | ε.  An arbitrary string of this language cannot be parsed without reading all its letters first which means that a pushdown automaton has to try alternative state transitions to accommodate for the different possible lengths of a semi-parsed string. This language is nondeterministic. Since nondeterministic context-free languages cannot be accepted in linear time, linear languages cannot be accepted in linear time in the general case. Furthermore, it is undecidable whether a given context-free language is a linear context-free language.

A language is linear iff it can be generated by a one-turn pushdown automaton -- a pushdown automaton that, once it starts popping, never pushes again.

Closure properties

Positive cases 
Linear languages are closed under union. Construction is the same as the construction for the union of context-free languages.

If L is a linear language and M is a regular language, then the intersection  is again a linear language; in other words, the linear languages are closed under intersection with regular sets.

Linear languages are closed under homomorphism and inverse homomorphism. 

Corollary: linear languages form a full trio. Full trios in general are language families that enjoy a couple of other desirable mathematical properties.

Negative cases 
Linear languages are not closed under intersection. For example, let , then their intersection is not only not linear, but also not context-free. See pumping lemma for context-free languages. 

As a corollary, linear languages are not closed under complement (as intersection can be constructed by de Morgan's laws out of union and complement).

References

Formal languages